Mian Gul Akbar Zeb is a former Pakistani diplomat and a member of the former royal family of Swat. He is the grandson of Miangul Jahan Zeb, (Wali of Swat) and son-in-law of the former Governor of Khyber Pakhtunkhwa, Miangul Aurangzeb. He has been in the Foreign Service of Pakistan since 1979 and has accomplished various assignments abroad and at home.

Mian Gul Akbar Zeb was born on 15 February 1954 to Miangul Alam Zeb at Saidu Sharif in the former ruling family of Swat. After graduation from the Cambridge University, he joined the Foreign Office of Pakistan in 1979 and since then accomplished various assignment at home and abroad. Following is the detail of his assignments:
 Section Officer, European Department. 1982–1983
 First & Second Secretary, Washington DC 1983–1987
 Director, MOFA in Africa, Afghanistan and the Foreign Secretary's Office 1988–1994
 Counselor (Political), New Delhi 1994–1999
 Deputy High Commissioner, New Delhi 1999–2000
 Director General, European Department. 2000–2002
 Director General Americas 2002–2004
 High Commissioner, to South Africa 2004–2005
 Ambassador to Afghanistan 2005–2008
 Pakistani High Commissioner to Canada 2009–2014 (Retired).

See also 

Miangul Jahan Zeb
Miangul Aurangzeb
Zebunisa Jilani

References

External links 
Pakistan High Commission Ottawa

Living people
High Commissioners of Pakistan to Canada
People from Swat District
Swat royal family
1954 births
Ambassadors of Pakistan to Afghanistan
Aitchison College alumni
High Commissioners of Pakistan to South Africa
Nawabs of Pakistan